Sherman is an unincorporated community in McLeod County, Minnesota, United States.  The community is located along McLeod County Road 5 near Winsted and Silver Lake.  County Roads 31 and 86 are also in the immediate area.

Sherman is located within Hale and Winsted Townships.

References

Unincorporated communities in Minnesota
Unincorporated communities in McLeod County, Minnesota